Street of Chance is a 1930 American pre-Code film directed by John Cromwell and starring William Powell, Jean Arthur, Kay Francis and Regis Toomey. Howard Estabrook was nominated for the Academy Award for Best Writing, Achievement.

Plot 
John Marsden, a famed and powerful New York gambler who refuses to throw a game, is devoted to his wife, Alma, and his impressionistic younger brother, "Babe," to whom he sends a wedding gift of $10,000, which Babe may keep on the condition that he does not indulge in gambling. Alma, dismayed by John's ruthless tactics and his obsession with gambling, threatens to leave him unless he takes his winnings and leaves the city with her. He agrees.

However, that evening Babe, who has become a cardsharp, comes to town with his new wife, Judith. He goes to see his brother, whom he believes is a stockbroker, unaware of John's true profession and the reality that he is trying to quit and rebuild his marriage. Babe insists on playing and tries to win a fortune with his savings in an organized gambling session. He wins remarkably. The professional gambler sees that his card-playing sibling is preparing to make the same mistakes he did.

John therefore decides to risk his life and gamble one more time, and to break the gambler's code and cheat by throwing the game, in order to disillusion Babe, thereby teaching him an unforgettable lesson. However, John is caught cheating by Dorgan and becomes a marked man. John is later mortally wounded, in spite of his wife's attempts to save him.

Cast
 William Powell as John D. Marsden
 Jean Arthur as Judith Marsden
 Kay Francis as Alma Marsden
 Regis Toomey as "Babe" Marsden
 Stanley Fields as Dorgan
 Brooks Benedict as Al Mastick
 Betty Francisco as Mrs. Mastick
 John Risso as Tony
 Joan Standing as Miss Abrams
 Maurice Black as Nick
 Irving Bacon as Harry
 John Cromwell as Imbrie (uncredited)

See also
 List of American films of 1930

External links
 
 
 

1930 films
1930 crime drama films
1930s English-language films
American crime drama films
American black-and-white films
Films directed by John Cromwell
Films produced by David O. Selznick
Films scored by John Leipold
Films about gambling
Paramount Pictures films
1930s American films